Tap O Lena (1990—2015) was a bay Quarter Horse mare, a champion cutting horse and a dam and granddam of champion cutting horses. She was bred, trained and shown by NCHA Rider Hall of Fame and NCHA Non-Pro Hall of Fame inductee Phil Rapp of Weatherford, TX who rode her to win 15 major NCHA aged event championships. Rapp's wife Mary Ann also showed the mare, and won 2 more non-pro championships, including the 1997 Non-Pro World Champion. Tap O Lena was inducted into the NCHA Horse Hall of Fame with lifetime earnings of $450,639.33 in cutting horse competition. She was bred to Dual Pep and produced Tapt Twice, earner of $279,457 and sire of cutting horses that have earned over $1.3 million.

Pedigree

Cutting (sport)
American Quarter Horse show horses
Cutting horses

References